Mohamed Touati (born 17 January 1939) is a former Tunisian cyclist. He was born in Tunis and his profession was a repairman.  He competed in the individual road race and team time trial events at the 1960 Summer Olympics.

References

External links
 

1939 births
Living people
Tunisian male cyclists
Olympic cyclists of Tunisia
Cyclists at the 1960 Summer Olympics
Sportspeople from Tunis
20th-century Tunisian people